Språkförsvaret ("the language defence") is a politically independent network working to strengthen the Swedish language in Sweden and Finland. It was established in 2005.

External links

Swedish language
Cultural organizations based in Sweden
2005 establishments in Sweden
Organizations established in 2005